The Icelandic national futsal team represents Iceland in international futsal competitions such as the FIFA Futsal World Cup and the European Championships and is controlled by the Football Association of Iceland. The team debuted in the UEFA Futsal Euro 2012 Preliminary Round.

Competition history

FIFA Futsal World Cup

UEFA European Futsal Championship

Current squad
Squad chosen for the UEFA Futsal Euro 2012 Preliminary Round, 21–24 January 2011

References

External links
 Official site
 Teams page on UEFA.com
 All played games until the end of 2014 on ksi.is

European national futsal teams
National sports teams of Iceland
Futsal in Iceland